Mayurpankhi is a publishing house of children's books based in Dhaka, Bangladesh specializing in picture books. It was founded in 2014 and publishes books in Bengali and English. Its CEO is Mitia Osman. In 2016, Mayurpankhi won the Bangla Academy's Rokonuzzaman Khan Dadabhai Smriti Award for children's literature.

References

External links 

 
Publishing companies of Bangladesh
Publishing companies established in 2014
Children's book publishers
Book publishing companies of Bangladesh